Yury Yurievich Boldyrev (born May 29, 1960) is a Russian economist and politician, he was a Senator from St. Petersburg from 1993 to 1995, and Deputy Chairman of the Accounts Chamber of Russia from 1995 to 2001.  Boldyrev was one of the founders of the Yabloko party, but left in 1995.

Biography
Born in 1960 in Leningrad in family of a military sailor.

He graduated from Saint Petersburg Electrotechnical University (1983) and Saint Petersburg State University of Economics (1989).

From 1989 to 1991, he was a Deputy of the USSR from Moscowsky, district of Leningrad.

From 1990 to February 1992, Boldyrev was member of the Supreme consultative and coordinating Council under the Chairman of the Supreme Soviet of the RSFSR, and then under President Boris Yeltsin.

In February 1992, he was advisor to the government of Russia. From March 1992 to March 4, 1993 — Chief State inspector of the RSFSR, the chief of control management of presidential Administration of the Russian Federation.

From December 1993 to December 1995 Yury Boldyrev was Senator from St. Petersburg.

In autumn 1993 he became one of the founders of the Yavlinsky-Boldyrev-Lukin electoral association (then Yabloko party), but on September 1, 1995 he left the party because of conflicts: first under the Central Bank law, then on access transnational capital to Russian natural resources (the Law of the "Production Sharing Agreement").

From March 1995 to January 2001 - Deputy Chairman of the Accounts Chamber of Russia.

After retiring in 2001, the year the civil service was engaged in journalism and public activities.

In 2012, participated in an attempt to nominate General Leonid Ivashov to the President of Russia. Then he was the confidant of the presidential candidate Gennady Zyuganov - he participated in the televised debates against the representatives of the candidates Vladimir Putin and Mikhail Prokhorov. He took part in the creation of a Permanent Conference of the National Patriotic Forces of Russia.

Family
Yury Boldyrev is married. There is a son Oleg, a graduate student of Moscow State University.

References

Boldyrev
1960 births
Living people
Yabloko politicians
20th-century Russian politicians
21st-century Russian politicians
Saint Petersburg University of Economics and Finance alumni